Rani Khera may refer to:

Places
 Rani Khera, Bachhrawan, a village in Uttar Pradesh, India
 Rani Khera, a village in Bharawan, Hardoi district, Uttar Pradesh, India
 Rani Khera, Delhi, an urban village and a constituent of the urban agglomeration of Delhi
 Rani Khera, Harpalpur, a village in Harpalpur, Hardoi, in Uttar Pradesh, India
 Rani Khera, Sareni, a village in Uttar Pradesh, India
 Rani Khera, Shivgarh, a village in Uttar Pradesh, India

See also 
 Maharani Khera